Celestial Blues is a 2021 album by King Woman.

Celestial Blues may also refer to:
 Celestial Blues, a 2012–2014 fiction trilogy by writer Vicki Pettersson
 "Celestial Blues", a track written by Andy Bey and covered by the Roots, Gary Bartz and the Avener, among others

See also
 Celestial Blue, a flower native to California